Günther Naumann (born 19 April 1941) is a German former skier. He competed in the Nordic combined event at the 1968 Winter Olympics.

References

External links
 

1941 births
Living people
German male Nordic combined skiers
Olympic Nordic combined skiers of West Germany
Nordic combined skiers at the 1968 Winter Olympics
People from Erzgebirgskreis
Sportspeople from Saxony